USS Traveller was a supply boat that served in the United States Navy in 1805.
 
Commodore Edward Preble acquired the fishing smack Traveller in June 1805 to carry supplies to American ships operating in the Mediterranean Sea. She apparently was under the command of Sailing Master Benjamin C. Prince.

Traveller was sold to Sir Alexander Ball in December 1805.

References

Auxiliary ships of the United States Navy